Saayad (Translation: Probably,सायद) is a 2012 Nepali Coming of age Comedy-drama film written and directed by Suroj Subba "Nalbo". Produced by Sunil Rawal under the banner of Durgish Films, the film features Sunil Rawal, Samyam Puri & Wilson Bikram Rai in pivotal roles.

Synopsis
 Saayad is the story of two generations living together, but experiencing the world in very different ways. Whereas the influence of a sincere, hardworking friend transforms the lives of a group of friends for the better, the arrogance of, and lack of guidance for the newer generation sets another group of friends on a track of drugs, death and destruction. The generational clash reveals how moral authority has become corrupted in Nepali society, and how the alienation of the younger generation is pushing them to anarchy.

Acclaimed writer-director Suroj Subba "Nalbo" has crafted a powerful coming-of-age moral tale, touching upon the dreams and heartbreaks of the young, and the improbable responsibilities of the more mature generations. Saayad is a rare gem in Nepali cinema.

Cast
Sunil Rawal as Nirag
 Samyam Puri as Yodin
 Wilson Bikram Rai as Ved
 Jharana Thapa as Samridhi
 Anita Dahal as shrish
 Ritika Lama as Suchi
 Gopal Yakten as palden
 Dinesh Rawal
 Kishowr Sambampe
 Indra Kumar
 Anil Bamjam
 Karishma Manandhar (Guest Appearance)
 Babu Bogati (Guest Appearance)

Plot
The movie ‘Saayad‘ is the story of two brothers Yodin (played by Samyam Puri) and Nirag (played by Sunil Rawal). After Yodin was born, their family had earned wealth and their life became more easier so Nirag considers Yodin a luck. Yodin's crush, Sirish, was the sister of Nirag's crush, Samridhi. Yodin's best friend Ved (played by Wilson Bikram Rai) introduced Yodin to drugs. Yodin and Ved's group started taking drugs because of the problems in the family and love lives.

Drugs caused them to neglect their study and get involved in gang fights. The story takes a U-turn when Sirish died. It is better to keep from telling, all about how Sirish died and how their lives changed after her death, not to spoil your movie experience in the theatre.

Sequel

The sequel of Saayad, Saayad 2 is made.

References

Nepalese coming-of-age films